The Leslie Commercial Historic District encompasses a one-block historic area of downtown Leslie, Arkansas.  The basically linear district runs on Main Street between Oak and Walnut Streets, and includes 18 buildings and a small city park.  Most of the buildings were built in the early decades of the 20th century, and are one and two-story brick buildings.

The district was listed on the National Register of Historic Places in 2017.  Previously listed buildings in the district include the American Legion Post No. 131, the Farmers Bank Building, and the Meek Building.

See also
National Register of Historic Places listings in Searcy County, Arkansas

References

Historic districts in Arkansas
National Register of Historic Places in Searcy County, Arkansas